The women's 40 kg powerlifting event at the 2012 Summer Paralympics was contested on 30 August at ExCeL London.

Records 
Prior to the competition, the existing world and Paralympic records were as follows.

The world record holder, Nazmiye Muslu of Turkey, broke both of these records during the competition.

Results

References 

 

Women's 040 kg
Para